Tianshui is the second-largest city in Gansu Province, China. The city is located in the southeast of the province, along the upper reaches of the Wei River and at the boundary of  the Loess Plateau and the Qinling Mountains. As of the 2020 census, its population was 2,984,659 inhabitants, of which 1,212,791 lived in the built-up (or metro) area made of the 2 urban districts of Qinzhou and Maiji. The city and its surroundings have played an important role in the early history of China, as still visible in the form of historic sites such as the Maijishan Grottoes.

History
Qin, whose House of Ying were the founding dynasty of the Chinese empire, developed from Quanqiu (present-day Lixian) to the south. After the invasions of the Rong which unseated the Western Zhou, Qin recovered the territory of Tianshui from the nomads. It became an important region of their duchy and, later, kingdom. Characteristically Qin tombs have been excavated at Fangmatan nearby, including one 2200-year-old map of Qin's Gui County.

Under the Qin Empire, the area was part of Longxi Commandery but the Emperor Wu of the Han separated the region as the Tianshui Commandery in 114 BC as part of his expansion towards the Tarim Basin. The general Li Guang came from the city. The Han conquests and explorations eventually resulted in the development of the Northern Silk Road: Tianshui formed its junction with the Wei River, after which it followed the road past Mount Long to Chang'an (present-day Xi'an). Nearby are the Maijishan Grottoes, filled with thousands of Buddhist sculptures representing figures such as Buddha and the original male form of Guanyin, produced between the Wei and Song dynasties by monks travelling along the road and by local Buddhists.

During the Northern Wei, the city was known as Hanyang and was the center of the Hanyang Commandery. During the Western Wei, this name was changed to Hanyang County. During the Tang and Five Dynasties, the city of Tianshui was known as Shanggui. It alternated with Chengji (present-day Qin'an) as the capital of the province of Qinzhou. Li County was separated from Tianshui's jurisdiction during the ninth year of Chenghua (AD 1473) during the Ming dynasty.

According to a legend, the name Tianshui (天水) originates from a lake formed from heaven, which would remain the same size year round.

Subdivisions

Geography
Tianshui is located in the valley of the Jie River, a major tributary of the Wei River, and on the boundary between the Loess Plateau and Qinling Mountains. The city has a monsoon-influenced, cool semi-arid (Köppen BSk)/humid continental (Dwa) climate, with four distinct seasons of comparatively equal length. With monthly percent possible sunshine ranging from 34% in September to 50% in December, the city receives 1,911 hours of bright sunshine annually.

Economy
Due to the mild climate, Tianshui is a large producer of fruits, in particular apples.

It is also a major industrial centre in Gansu province, especially regarding electronics. Some major industries include:
 AVIC Tianshui Aviation Industry
 Tianshui Pneumatic Machinery Corporation
 Tianshui Tractor Factory
 Spark Machine Tools

Transportation

Airlines
Tianshui Maijishan Airport is located near the built up area.

Railway

Tianshui is currently serviced by Tianshui railway station on the Longhai Railway. The railway station is connected to downtown by the Tianshui Tram.

A new high-speed railway station, Tianshui South railway station, opened in 2017.

The Tianshui–Longnan railway is currently under construction and will add a north–south link to the county.

Highways
The  Lianyungang–Khorgas Expressway connects Tianshui to Baoji/Xi'an in the east and Dingxi, Lanzhou towards the northwest and supersedes highway G310. G310 runs as a motorway within the urban centre.

 G7011 Shiyan–Tianshui Expressway
 G8513 Pingliang–Mianyang Expressway (section from Tianshui north to Pingliang is under construction)
 China National Highway 310

Culture 
Tianshui's signature dish is Guagua (呱呱), a sticky boiled buckwheat flour meal, seasoned with chili oil, sesame paste, mustard, oil, salt, vinegar and garlic paste. The dish is normally eaten as a breakfast. According to legends it was the imperial food during Han dynasty general Wei Xiao's rule.

Tourism
 Maijishan Grottoes
 Fuxi Temple
 Yuquan Temple
 Dadiwan Site

Education
 Tianshui Normal University
 Gansu Electric Science Research Institute

See also
List of twin towns and sister cities in China
 Tianshui Association

References

External links

Official website of Tianshui Government

 
Prefecture-level divisions of Gansu
Cities in Gansu